Provenance is a 2017 science fiction novel by Ann Leckie. Although it is set in the same universe as her 2013 Ancillary Justice and its sequels, it is not itself a sequel. It is published by Orbit Books.

Synopsis

When Ingray Aughskold pays to have a convicted criminal released from prison, as part of a complex plot involving forgery and stolen antiquities, she rapidly finds herself drawn into a much more serious plot involving murder and angry aliens.

Relation to other novels
Early in the narrative there is a mention of the treaty, concluded at the end of Ancillary Mercy, between newly independent AI's and the mysterious alien Presger civilization. As well, a Radchaai character plays a role.

Reception

Kirkus Reviews praised the book as "more Leckie to love", and described its theme as "what binds children to their families", while noting that the title "Provenance" has multiple meanings – not only the provenance of antiquities, but also the question of "where people come from and how it made them what they are". Publishers Weekly lauded its "charm and wit", but faulted it for not "quite hav(ing) the depth and richness Leckie fans might expect".

At the Guardian, Adam Roberts considered the novel to be "intricately, if linearly and rather shallowly, plotted", with Ingray being a "likeable heroine, but not a terribly remarkable one", while at National Public Radio, Genevieve Valentine described it as a cozy mystery that "makes (...) a fitting addition to the Ancillary world" (while conceding that Provenances characters "do not possess the immediate power of Breq", the protagonist of the Ancillary novels).

James Nicoll observed that the plot is largely driven by "angling for advantage in the next election", and compared it to the works of CJ Cherryh (albeit with "more transparent" prose and a protagonist who was "not chronically sleep-deprived"), and correctly predicted that it would be a nominee for the 2018 Hugo Award for Best Novel.

References

2017 American novels
2017 science fiction novels
American science fiction novels
Novels by Ann Leckie
Orbit Books books